Phricogenes is a genus of moths in the family Gelechiidae. It contains the single species Phricogenes sophronopa, which is found in New Guinea.

References

Gnorimoschemini